Leftfield are a British electronic music group formed in 1989 a duo of Neil Barnes and Paul Daley (the latter formerly of the Rivals and A Man Called Adam). The duo was influential in the evolution of electronic music in the 1990s, with Mixmag describing them as "the single most influential production team working in British dance music". As with many of their contemporaries, such as the Chemical Brothers and Fatboy Slim, Leftfield are notable for their use of guest vocalists in their works. Among them were Toni Halliday on "Original", Johnny Rotten on "Open Up", Djum Djum on "Afro-Left", and Earl 16 and Cheshire Cat on "Release the Pressure". The term progressive house was coined to define their style, a fusion of house with dub and reggae.

There was a hiatus in recording and live performances between 2002 and 2010. When Barnes revived Leftfield, Daley declined to be involved, to focus on his solo career. After touring for a few years, Barnes finished writing new material for a third Leftfield album, Alternative Light Source. In 2022, they released their fourth studio album titled This Is What We Do.

Formation
Neil Barnes' music career started off as a DJ at The Wag Club while simultaneously playing percussion on a session basis. In 1986, he joined the London School of Samba and played the bateria in the 1986 Notting Hill Carnival. Around 1989, inspired by Afrika Bambaataa, Barnes decided to try his hand at electronic music production, the results of which were the tracks "Not Forgotten" and "More Than I Know", released on the Rhythm King label. For the remixes of these tracks, Barnes called upon Paul Daley, percussion player with A Man Called Adam and formerly a session musician for the Brand New Heavies and Primal Scream, appearing on their Dixie-Narco EP. Barnes and Daley had previously worked together as percussionists at The Sandals first club, Violets. Described by Barnes as "[t]he sound of 15 years of frustration coming out in one record", the piece was termed "Progressive House" by Mixmag and held significant prominence in nightclubs from 1991 onwards. As their mutual interest in electronic music became clear the pair decided that they would work instead upon Leftfield, once Barnes had extricated himself from his now troublesome contract with Rhythm King subsidiary, Outer Rhythm. The name Leftfield was originally used by Barnes for his first single, with editing/arranging and additional production undertaken by Daley. However, after this, Daley was subsequently involved in remixing "Not Forgotten" and thereafter in the creation of all of Leftfield's work until the band split up in 2002.

During this period, in which the band could not release their own music owing to the legal dispute with Rhythm King, the pair undertook remix work for React 2 Rhythm, I.C.P. (Ice Cool Productions), Supereal, Inner City, Sunscreem, Ultra Naté and provided two remixes to David Bowie's single "Jump They Say". Finally, once the problems with their former label had been sorted out, Leftfield were able to unveil their single "Release the Pressure".

Albums

Leftism
Leftfield's first major career break came with the single "Open Up", a collaboration with John Lydon (of Sex Pistols fame) that was soon followed by their debut album, Leftism in 1995, blending dub, breakbeat, and house. It was shortlisted for the 1995 Mercury Music Prize but lost out to Portishead's Dummy. In a 1998 Q magazine poll, readers voted it the eightieth greatest album of all time, while in 2000 Q placed it at number 34 in its list of the 100 Greatest British Albums Ever. The album was re-released in 2000 with a bonus disc of remixes, and again in 2017 as a remastered version with eleven completely new remixes.

Rhythm and Stealth
Their second album, Rhythm and Stealth (1999) maintained a similar style, and featured Roots Manuva, Afrika Bambaataa and MC Cheshire Cat from Birmingham.  The album was shortlisted for the Mercury Music Prize in 2000 but lost out to Badly Drawn Boy's The Hour of Bewilderbeast.  It reached No. 1 in the UK Albums Chart. The album featured the song "Phat Planet" which featured on Guinness' 1999 advert, Surfer, and "6/8 War" featured on the Volkswagen Lupo Advert 'Demon Baby'. The track "Double Flash" featured in the PlayStation software game Music 2000. Leftfield split in 2002, with both Barnes and Daley planning to work on separate solo projects.

Reformation and Alternative Light Source 
Leftfield headlined Creamfields in Cheshire, England in August 2010, RockNess in Dores, Scotland in June 2010, and played the final set on the main stage at Ireland's three-day festival, Electric Picnic in September. Further headline festival shows were announced in the coming weeks. Leftfield is now represented by Neil Barnes on keyboards and drum programming, with a rotating group of vocalists, MC Cheshire Cat, Adam Wren on engineering and programming and Sebastian 'Bid' Beresford on drums. Founding member Paul Daley declined to rejoin, focusing on his solo DJ career.

On 25 March 2015, the new single, "Universal Everything", was premiered on Annie Mac's BBC Radio 1 show. Shortly afterwards the new album was announced via the Leftfield website and social networks, along with UK tour dates for June 2015.

Alternative Light Source, Leftfield's first album in 16 years, was released on 8 June 2015 on Infectious Records. On 1 June 2015 the album premiere was streamed live on Twitter, coupled with conversation via hashtag #leftfieldstream.
"Head and Shoulders" features Sleaford Mods on vocals, and its stop-motion and animation hybrid video debuted on Pitchfork on 6 August 2015.

This Is What We Do 
A new album was declared finished by Barnes via Twitter on 4 February 2022, and has since been titled: "This Is What We Do". It was released on 2 December 2022.

Commercial use of tracks
The song "Phat Planet" was used in the "Surfers" TV advertisement for Guinness, ranked number one in Channel 4's Top 100 Adverts list in 2000. "Phat Planet" was also used in the animated television series Beast Machines: Transformers, the simulation racing games F1 2000 by EA Sports and Racedriver GRID by Codemasters. In addition, their song "Release the Pressure" was used on advertisements for the O2 mobile phone network at its launch, and the Kerry Group's Cheestrings snack in 2006. "A Final Hit" was featured on the Trainspotting soundtrack; the b-side "Afro Ride" was also featured on the soundtracks to both wipE'out" and wipE'out" 2097 although it did not appear on the album of the first game.

A white label release called "Snakeblood" was featured on the soundtrack of The Beach (2000). The song was found to have sampled OMD's "Almost" without permission.

The song "Storm 3000" has been used as the theme tune for the BBC television programme Dragons' Den.

Live performances
 In Leftfield's Amsterdam show, the Dutch police were close to arresting the venue sound engineers due to the sound system reaching illegal volumes. At the next concert, in Belgium, 30 people were given refunds after complaining that the sound level was too high, leading to a newspaper headline reading "LEFTFIELD TOO LOUD". In June 1996, while the group was playing at Brixton Academy, the sound system caused dust and plaster to fall from the ceiling; subsequently, the group was banned from ever returning to the venue. The ban however was taken by the band as a ban on the sound system and not themselves, which was confirmed when Leftfield returned to Brixton again on Saturday 20 May 2000.

In November and December 2010, Leftfield did a series of dates around the UK and Ireland.  Friday 3 December's gig saw more plaster fall from Brixton Academy's ceiling.

Discography

Studio albums

Compilation albums

Live albums

Singles

Soundtracks and various compilations
 From the Shallow Grave soundtrack
"Shallow Grave" (Featuring Christopher Eccleston)
"Release the Dubs"
 From the Hackers soundtrack:
"Inspection (Check One)"
"Open Up" (featuring John Lydon)
 From the wipE'out" soundtrack
"Afro Ride" (from the EP Afro-Left)
 From 104.9 (An XFM Compilation)
"Praise"
 From the Trainspotting soundtrack
"A Final Hit"
 From the Trainspotting#2 soundtrack
"A Final Hit" (full-length version)
 From the wipE'out" 2097 soundtrack
"Afro Ride" (from the EP Afro-Left)
 From the Go soundtrack
"Swords" (featuring Nicole Willis) (Original Version)
 From The Beach soundtrack
"Snakeblood"
 From the Vanilla Sky soundtrack
"Afrika Shox"
 From Beast Machines, and EA Sports F1 2000
"Phat Planet"
 From Lara Croft: Tomb Raider
"Song of Life"

References

External links
 Leftfield official website
 Leftfield Facebook
 Leftfield Twitter
 Leftfield SoundCloud
 Leftfield Spotify
 Leftfield iTunes
 Not Forgotten: unofficial website

English house music duos
Progressive house musicians
Male musical duos
Musical groups from London
Musical groups established in 1989
1989 establishments in England
Rhythm King artists
Electronic dance music duos